Glaucocharis senekai is a moth in the family Crambidae. It was described by Julius Ganev in 1987. It is found in Libya.

References

Diptychophorini
Moths described in 1987